The Atlanta Soul is a professional women's ultimate frisbee team based in Atlanta which competes in the Premier Ultimate League (PUL). The team joined the PUL for the league's inaugural 2019 season. Their stated mission is to "increase the visibility of female athletes and catalyze a culture shift in sports entertainment by providing quality and accessible programming that encourages girls in under-resourced Atlanta communities to realize their potential and power." The team is also noteworthy for their sponsorship of the Color of Ultimate: ATL game, the first Color of Ultimate showcase game.

Franchise history 
The Atlanta Soul formed in 2018 for a series of women's professional games featuring matches between teams from Indianapolis (Red), Detroit (Riveters), Nashville (Nightshade), Raleigh (Radiance), and Austin (Torch). The Medellin Revolution also played one game in this series. Most of these teams, including the Atlanta Soul, went on to become founding members of the PUL.

The Soul is one of the original eight teams in the Premier Ultimate League, which had its inaugural season in 2019. The Soul is co-owned by Angela Lin and Maddy Frey.

The team would have played its second season in 2020, but the PUL cancelled the season due to the COVID-19 pandemic.

In response to the COVID-19 pandemic, the PUL elected to hold a limited 2021 competition season with games occurring across three weekends in August 2021, but the Soul opted not to compete.

Record 
In their 2019 regular season, the Soul defeated the Austin Torch 19-15 and the Nashville Nightshade 23–16. They fell to the Medellin Revolution 20-30 and 17–24, and to the NY Gridlock 19–21. In the playoffs semifinal game, the Soul fell to the Medellin Revolution in a tightly contested double-overtime rematch, 26–27.

Current coaching staff 

 Coach - Aileen Thomas
 Coach - Meredith Leahy

Roster
The team's 2020 roster was as follows:

*captain

Color of Ultimate 
The Soul, along with the Atlanta Hustle, sponsored and supported the first Color of Ultimate game, held in Atlanta on June 22, 2019. The Color of Ultimate showcase games are a project of the Atlanta Flying Disc Club (AFDC) Project Diversity initiative aimed at raising the profiles of elite ultimate players of color from around the world.

References

External links 

 
 

Premier Ultimate League teams
Ultimate (sport) teams
Ultimate teams established in 2018
2018 establishments in Georgia (U.S. state)